Welch is an unincorporated community in Welch Township, Goodhue County, Minnesota, United States.

Welch is along County 7 Boulevard near Highway 61, 36 miles southeast of St. Paul. The Cannon River flows through the community. The Canyon Valley Trail (CVT), which runs from Cannon Falls to Red Wing, goes through the village.

Welch is within ZIP code 55089.

References

Unincorporated communities in Minnesota
Unincorporated communities in Goodhue County, Minnesota